Callionymus luridus, the Macclesfield longtail dragonet, is a species of dragonet found on the Macclesfield Bank in the South China Sea.

References 

L
Fish described in 1983
Taxa named by Ronald Fricke